Welbourn is a village in Lincolnshire, England.

Welbourn may also refer to:

Welbourn, New Zealand, suburb of New Plymouth, New Zealand
Welbourn (surname)

See also 
Welburn (disambiguation)